Charles Atwater (January 2, 1815 – December 6, 1891) was an American politician and Senator from Connecticut.

Atwater, second son of Charles and Lucy C. (Root) Atwater, was born in New Haven, Connecticut, on January 2, 1815. His father was President of the Iron and Steel Works, a banker, and a West India merchant. He graduated from Yale College in 1834.  

After graduation, he spent a year in the Princeton Theological Seminary, but in 1835 he became a member of a firm of wholesale grocers in Philadelphia, where he married Mary, daughter of Joseph Montgomery, on Sept. 26, 1836. In 1840 he returned to New Haven, where the rest of his life was spent. 

He was for many years extensively engaged in the wholesale iron and hardware business, and was prominent in many public interests in New Haven. In 1861 he was a representative in the Connecticut Legislature, and in 1862 a member of the Connecticut Senate. His interest in the Birmingham Iron and Steel Works led him to be an active promoter of the New Haven and Derby Railroad, of which he was long the Treasurer.  

In 1872 he was the Democratic candidate for Lieutenant-Governor, and in two later years was nominated by the Greenback party for the office of Governor.

He died in New Haven from Bright's disease, after about a week's illness, on December 6, 1891, in his 77th year.

His wife died on July 5, 1855, and on October 15, 1856, he married her sister, Emily Montgomery, who died in October, 1885.  Six children survived him—a son and two daughters by the first marriage, and two daughters and a son by the second. The youngest daughter is the wife of David Daggett and the younger son was graduated at the Sheffield Scientific School in 1879.

External links

1815 births
1891 deaths
Politicians from New Haven, Connecticut
Yale College alumni
Princeton Theological Seminary alumni
Democratic Party members of the Connecticut House of Representatives
Democratic Party Connecticut state senators
Greenback Party politicians